Kiewa River, a perennial river that is part of the Murray catchment within the Murray-Darling basin, is located in the Alpine bioregion, in the Australian state of Victoria.

The Kiewa River is also known by several variations on its name in its upper reaches, variously named as Kiewa River East branch and West Kiewa River (or similar).

The name Kiewa is an Aboriginal word, derived from cy-a-nun-a, meaning sweet, and wher-ra, meaning water.

Location and features
The main river is formed by the confluence of the Kiewa River East branch and West Kiewa River. The Kiewa River flows generally north northwest, joined by eleven minor tributaries, towards its confluence with the Murray River, southeast of Albury and east of Wodonga. The main river descends  over its  course, sedately through cleared farming country downstream of Mount Beauty; the West Kiewa River descends  over its  course, in near-pristine ash and peppermint forest country where the flow is swift, upstream of the town of Mount Beauty.

Snowfall is common in the upper reaches of the river during winter, with up to  precipitation, mainly as snow.

The McKay Creek and West Kiewa power stations are the major generating elements of the Scheme, which provides peak load to the Victorian electricity grid.

Within the Kiewa Valley are the towns of Mount Beauty, Tawonga, Tangambalanga/Kiewa Township, and Yackandandah. The river is crossed by the Murray Valley Highway at Killara, near its mouth. The Kiewa Valley Highway is located adjacent to much of the course of the river.

Recreation activities
Tawonga Huts, a series of huts and ruins, are located on the lower reaches of the West Kiewa River, within Alpine National Park and are accessible by experienced hikers. The Kiewa is a popular fly fishing stream for local anglers as it holds good populations of wild brown and rainbow trout.
The East and West branches of the Kiewa provide important white water paddling opportunities for Victorian kayakers. The most reliable time to paddle is in spring during the snow melt.
The upper reaches of the Kiewa River and the Bogong High Plains are a very popular area for cross-country skiing through winter and through to the early spring months.

See also

 
 Skiing in Victoria, Australia

References

External links

 5.41MB
Paddling Guide

North-East catchment
Rivers of Hume (region)
Tributaries of the Murray River
Alpine National Park